United States v. Councilman, 373 F.3d 197 (1st Cir. 2004), reversed en banc, 418 F.3d 67 (1st Cir. 2005), was a criminal case involving interception of e-mail while in temporary storage en route to its final destination. Earlier rulings in the case had raised concerns about the privacy of e-mail and the effectiveness of the Electronic Communications Privacy Act of 1986 (ECPA).

Indictment
Defendant Bradford C. Councilman was Vice President of Interloc, Inc., which ran an online rare and out-of-print book listing service. As part of its service, Interloc gave book dealer customers an e-mail address at the domain "interloc.com" and acted as the e-mail provider. Councilman managed the e-mail service and the dealer subscription list.

On July 11, 2001, a grand jury returned a two-count indictment against Councilman. Count One charged him under 18 U.S.C. § 371, the general federal criminal conspiracy statute, and for conspiracy to violate the Wiretap Act, 18 U.S.C. § 2511. According to the indictment, in January 1998, Councilman directed Interloc employees to intercept and copy all incoming communications to subscriber dealers from Amazon.com, an Internet retailer that sells books and other products. The alleged object of the conspiracy was to exploit the content of e-mail from Amazon.com to dealers in order to develop a list of books, learn about competitors, and attain a commercial advantage for Interloc and its parent company.

Dismissal and reinstatement
Councilman moved to dismiss the indictment for failure to state an offense under the Wiretap Act, arguing that the intercepted e-mail messages were in "electronic storage," as defined in 18 U.S.C. § 2510(17), and therefore were not, as a matter of law, subject to the prohibition on "intercept[ing] . . . electronic communication[s]," 18 U.S.C. § 2511(1)(a). The district court granted Councilman's motion, and a divided three-judge panel of the First Circuit Court of Appeals  affirmed. However, the First Circuit then reviewed the decision en banc and reversed.

The court held: "Although the text of the statute does not specify whether the term "electronic communication" includes communications in electronic storage, the legislative history of the ECPA indicates that Congress intended the term to be defined broadly. Furthermore, that history confirms that Congress did not intend, by including electronic storage within the definition of wire communications, to thereby exclude electronic storage from the definition of electronic communications."

Final Disposition
In February 2007, Councilman was acquitted of all charges, the Associated Press reported. The case against him was based on claims by two Interloc employees that he had instructed them to keep copies of the mail. Councilman denied those claims, a detail not previously noted in press reports. In 2007 a Massachusetts jury agreed that the employees' claims were not credible, that Councilman had not instructed them, and dismissed the case.

See also
Stengart v. Loving Care Agency

References

External links
 
 
EPIC page with links to amicus briefs

Internet privacy case law
United States Internet case law
2007 in United States case law
United States privacy case law
United States Court of Appeals for the First Circuit cases